The Interrupted Journey is a 1949 British thriller film directed by Daniel Birt and starring Valerie Hobson, Richard Todd, Christine Norden and Tom Walls. The railways scenes were shot at Longmoor in Hampshire. The film includes a train crash occurring after someone pulls the emergency cord, as had happened in the Winsford train crash the previous year.

Plot
John North (Todd), a struggling writer, plans to elope with his mistress, Susan Wilding (Norden), following an incidental quarrel that morning with his wife Carol (Hobson) who is frustrated that her husband refuses employment offered by her father, considering their perilous finances. After meeting Susan in London, he suspects they are being followed both in the street and at the railway cafe where they have a cup of tea, though Susan is dismissive of his concerns. Once they are on the train, he cannot rid himself of his unease as they sit discussing their new life together. John is guilt-ridden while recollecting the quarrel and feels affection for his wife. Seeing Susan is asleep, he goes out into the corridor, and again thinks he sees the man he believes has been following them. At this point, John hears a ticket inspector mention that the train is approaching a point on the line which is close to his house. When he then thinks he sees Susan's husband further along the corridor, John panics and pulls the emergency communication cord to stop the train. As the train stops, he passes the still-sleeping Susan and jumps off the train and makes for his house, just a couple of minutes away. He tells his wife he has decided to take the job with her father's company and they embrace.

Suddenly, they hear the sound of a train crash nearby. Carol immediately runs to help the victims, while John is stunned as he realises it involves the train he has just left. He walks alongside the wreckage and in a shattered carriage sees a lifeless arm that clearly belongs to his mistress. She and many others in the carriage have been killed in the collision. John says nothing about his presence on the train to his wife, maintaining that he returned from London by bus.

In the next day's newspaper, John reads the details of the crash. After he pulled the cord and the train stopped, it had been struck by another train, with twenty dead and others injured, but bodies still being recovered from the wreckage. Then Clayton, a British Railways crash inspector, arrives, and questions John, telling him that they recovered a document connecting John and Susan which was found on the man who had been following them, a private detective hired by her husband, both of whom had been identified as among the dead in the crash. However, Carol points out that initials used in the notes could also refer to Susan's husband.

Eventually, John admits to his wife that he was on the train and had been running away with another woman, but had pulled the cord and jumped off after changing his mind. When she says she will stand by him, he determines to confess to Clayton, only to hear on the radio that the crash had been caused by a failed signal rather than his pulling the cord. They still go to tell Clayton, who says that he won't make anything more of John's actions.

The next day, however, Clayton arrives at the house with Police Inspector Waterson. It has now been discovered that, before the train crash, Mrs Wilding was shot through the heart. Waterson says they suspect that John killed her and then jumped off the train. John denies it, but that evening the police recover a revolver from their garden pond.

Fearing he could be hanged for a crime he did not commit, John visits the Wildings' house in London, suspecting that Mr Wilding is still alive. However, Wilding's mother tells him that she identified her son's body. John then travels down to the hotel in Plymouth where he had planned to stay with Susan. There, he finds Wilding, who tells him that he was on the train and murdered his wife for being unfaithful, and then planted his identifying papers on one of the dead. The two men fight and Wilding shoots John in the head.

Next, John is back on the train, apparently recovering from his panic attack in the corridor. Instead of pulling the cord, John returns to Susan and expresses his doubts about what they are doing. Now, she pulls the cord and tells him to go back to his wife. He jumps from the train and arrives at his house, and he and his wife embrace. Then he hears the sound of a train whistle, but it is just the train he stopped moving off again.

Cast

Production
Tony Havelock-Allen was running a production company, Constellation Films. Daniel Birt was an editor who wanted to direct and brought Interrupted Journey to the company. Havelock-Allen was married to Valerie Hobson at the time and he also felt the movie might make a good vehicle for Richard Todd who had just become a star with The Hasty Heart. The producer later recalled:
I didn't think much of the project, but if you have a company you have to do something, because the money keeps on going out. It had no success at all, however. Daniel Birt was obviously not going to be a great director; editors can always make films but only the very talented ones can make good films.
The film was originally known as The Cord. Todd was borrowed from Associated British Pictures.

To help accurately portray officers of the Plymouth City Police, Havelock-Allan wrote to the Chief Constable, Mr J.F. Skittery, asking for advice on the design of police uniforms. Skittery responded by compiling a small hand-written book containing photographs of clothing, helmets, badges and equipment, and enclosed enough helmet badges, collar badges and buttons to supply all of the cast in the film who would be portraying Plymouth City Police officers.

Reception
The film's ending is sometimes considered by critics to be contrived, as Todd realises that much of the plot has been a nightmare and awakens from this dream sequence shortly before the conclusion for a happy ending. However, it has been noted that the whole film "simulates the qualities of a nightmare" through its use of coincidences and the lighting. The Encyclopedia of Film Noir describes it as a "superior film noir" and compares its ending to the 1944 The Woman in the Window. There is also a parallel to the more modern 1998 film Sliding Doors, dealing as it does with two alternate realities.

References

External links
 
 

1949 films
British thriller films
1940s thriller films
Films directed by Daniel Birt
Films produced by Anthony Havelock-Allan
British black-and-white films
Films set in Devon
British Lion Films films
1940s English-language films
1940s British films